Second Lady of Brazil is a title given to the hostess of the Jaburu Palace. This title is less used when compared to the title of First Lady of Brazil.

The term second lady, made in contrast to first lady (who is almost all the time the spouse of the president), was used by Josina Peixoto (whose husband, Floriano Peixoto, was vice president in 1891) to refer to the spouse of the Vice President.

The visibility of the Second Lady in the public sphere has been a recent development besides the role of the First Lady as hostess of the Alvorada Palace (previously the Catete Palace and the Itamaraty Palace) dates from the beginning of the republic.

Ten Second Ladies became First Ladies of Brazil during her spouses tenures as President. The first was Josina Peixora, wife of Floriano Peixoto, who was the first Vice President in 1891 and the second President from 1891 to 1894. The last one was Marcela Temer, wife of Michel Temer, who had served as 24th Vice President from 2011 to 2016 and 37th President from 2016 to 2019. Mariquita Aleixo wasn't officially established as First Lady, as her husband was prevented from assuming office. Only Francisca Ribeiro was First Lady and later assumed the role of Second Lady.

The current Second Lady of Brazil is Paula Mourão, wife of 25th Vice President of Brazil Hamilton Mourão. On 1 January 2023, Lu Alckmin, wife of Vice President-elect Geraldo Alckmin, will assume the role.

History

Even no country concedes any legal power to the Second Ladies, their roles frequently include hosting during reception in the vice presidential residence, to escort the Vice President in official trips and many ceremonial duties. Recently, the vice presidential spouses assume public roles which attracted significant attention from the media.

In 2011, Marcela Temer, wife of 24th Vice President Michel Temer, was involved with president Dilma Rousseff in the Prevention and Treatment of Cervical and Breast Cancer program, which was launched in Amazon Theatre.

Paula Mourão launched the Clean Hands, Healthy Life campaign in April 2020, along the Brazilian Culture Institute, with the objective of raise donaitions of soaps and alcohol gel to be distributed in Brasília, federal capital, with destination to poor people who are in social isolation due to the COVID-19 pandemic in Brazil. Followed by a voluntary team, Paula distributed 4,000 hygiene kits to families of poor communities of Itapoã and Sol Nascente, who live in vulnerable situation. In Jabiru's Palace, the Second Lady formalized the deliver of the donations to Itapoã administrator, to the Commander of the 2nd Western Regional Policing Command and to the Commander of the 2nd Military Police Battalion, who conducted the donations and distributed them to the needy.

There were 14 vacancies of the role, the longest one had been the 16 years landmark between Clotilde de Mello Vianna and Beatriz Ramos. This vacancy occurred due to the abolition of the office of Vice President of Brazil during the Vargas Era. The most recent period without a Second Lady was between Marcela Temer and Paula Mourão.

The youngest Second Lady in history was Maria Thereza Goulart, aged 19 when assumed the role. The oldest was Mariza Gomes, aged 67. Gomes' record will be surpassed on 1 January 2023, when Lu Alckmin will assume role at the age of 71.

Gallery of Vice Presidential couples

List of second ladies of Brazil

Other spouses of Brazilian vice presidents
Various other spouses of vice presidents of Brazil are not considered as second ladies of Brazil because their marriages were not during the vice presidential terms of their husbands.

Two Brazilian vice presidents were widowed prior to their vice presidencies:
 Francisco Rosa e Silva was married to Maria das Dores Rosa e Silva from 1883 until her death in 1892.
 Adalberto Pereira dos Santos was married to Julieta Pereira dos Santos from 1941 until her death in 1968.

Two Brazilian vice presidents were widowed and remarried prior to their vice presidencies:
 Fernando de Melo Viana was married to Maria José de Melo Viana. He was subsequently married to Alfrida Viana from 1906 until her death in 1928.
 Hamilton Mourão was married to Elisabeth Mourão from 1976 until her death in 2016. He has subsequently been married to Paula de Oliveira since 2018.

One Brazilian vice president was divorced prior to his vice presidency:
 Itamar Franco was married to Ana Elisa Surerus from 1968 until 1978.

One Brazilian vice president was divorced and remarried prior to his vice presidency:
 Michel Temer was married to Maria Célia de Toledo from 1969 until 1987. He has subsequently been married to Marcela Tedeschi since 2003.

One Brazilian vice president remarried after his vice presidency:
 Francisco Rosa e Silva was married to Heloísa Rosa e Silva from 1911 until 1929.

See also
 First Lady of Brazil
 Vice President of Brazil

Notes

References

Brazil 2